Vorontsovo is a rural locality (a village) in Novoalexandrovskoye Rural Settlement, Suzdalsky District, Vladimir Oblast, Russia. The population was 3 as of 2010.

Geography 
Vorontsovo is located on the Kolochka River, 29 km southwest of Suzdal (the district's administrative centre) by road. Goloventsino is the nearest rural locality.

References 

Rural localities in Suzdalsky District